Benny Södergren (born 23 June 1948 in Torshälla) is a former Swedish cross-country skier who competed during the 1970s. He won a bronze medal in the 50 km at the 1976 Winter Olympics in Innsbruck.

Cross-country skiing results
All results are sourced from the International Ski Federation (FIS).

Olympic Games
 1 medal – (1 bronze)

World Championships

References

External links
 
 

1948 births
Living people
People from Eskilstuna Municipality
Cross-country skiers at the 1976 Winter Olympics
Swedish male cross-country skiers
Olympic medalists in cross-country skiing
Medalists at the 1976 Winter Olympics
Olympic bronze medalists for Sweden
Sportspeople from Södermanland County